Gnabagangal is a 2009 Tamil-language drama film directed by M. Jeevan. It stars lyricist Pa. Vijay (in his acting debut) and Sridevika.
This is a remake of the Hindi film Raincoat (2004), with only difference in the purpose of protagonist's visit to his ex-love.

Cast
Pa. Vijay as Kadhiravan aka Meerapriyan 
Sridevika as Meera
Nizhalgal Ravi
Thennavan
Bava Lakshmanan
Thalapathy Dinesh
Silandhi Chandru

Soundtrack
Soundtrack was composed by debutant James Vick.
"Gnabagam Illayo" - S. P. Balasubrahmanyam
"Azhage" - Krish
"Ammannu Solrathu" - Krish
"Ennadi" - Tippu, Anuradha Sriram
"Kadalil" - Karthik, Suchithra
"Unnal Mudiyum" - Tippu

Critical reception
Sify wrote "The story is as old as the hills, and it is hard to believe that it is based on a real life experience of Vijay's friend during his struggling dates. There is no logic and reason in Vijay's story, as it is screeching, sentimental, soap style, over the top melodrama suited more for the Tamil stage of the 50s". Behindwoods wrote "Gnabagangal has the kind of story that poses the risk of sounding way over-the-top melodramatic or just plain clichéd, if the treatment lacked sensibility." Rediff wrote "The screenplay is one huge yawn-fest potted with inadvertent comical situations, mostly provided by Pa Vijay himself. The man, together with director Jeevan, needs a couple of hundred acting and screenplay-writing classes. Meantime, maybe Pa Vijay should stick to lyrics." Times of India wrote "The film has enough drama and pathos, but too goes too much into the conversation mode."

References

External links
 Gnabagangal at Oneindia.in

2009 films
2009 drama films
Indian drama films
2000s Tamil-language films
Indian films based on actual events